The 1966 French Championships (now known as the French Open) was a tennis tournament that took place on the outdoor clay courts at the Stade Roland-Garros in Paris, France. The tournament ran from 23 May until 5 June. It was the 70th staging of the French Championships, and the second Grand Slam tennis event of 1966. Tony Roche and Ann Jones won the singles titles.

Finals

Men's singles

 Tony Roche defeated  István Gulyás 6–1, 6–4, 7–5

Women's singles

 Ann Jones defeated  Nancy Richey  6–3, 6–1

Men's doubles

 Clark Graebner /  Dennis Ralston defeated  Ilie Năstase /  Ion Ţiriac 6–3, 6–3, 6–0

Women's doubles

 Margaret Smith /  Judy Tegart defeated  Jill Blackman /  Fay Toyne 4–6, 6–1, 6–1

Mixed doubles

 Annette Van Zyl /  Frew McMillan defeated  Ann Jones /  Clark Graebner 1–6, 6–3, 6–2

References

External links
 French Open official website

French Championships
French Championships (tennis) by year
French Champ
French Championships
French Championships
French Championships